The 2011 North Norfolk District Council election to the North Norfolk District Council took place on Thursday 5 May 2011. The previous election was the 2007 North Norfolk District Council election

There were 48 seats up for election, all councillors from all wards. The results of the election produced a majority for the Conservatives who gained overall control of the council for the first time, replacing the Liberal Democrats.

Election result

Ward results

References

2011 English local elections
2011
2010s in Norfolk